Mariana Agathangelou (born 14 August 1988) is a British badminton player. She competed for England in the mixed team event at the 2010 Commonwealth Games where she won a bronze medal. She went on to represent Jersey in the same competition at the 2014 Commonwealth Games but was eliminated in the knockout stages.

Achievements

European Championships 
Women's doubles

European Junior Championships 
Girls' doubles

BWF International Challenge/Series 
Women's doubles

Mixed doubles

  BWF International Challenge tournament
  BWF International Series tournament

References

External links 
 

1988 births
Living people
English female badminton players
Badminton players at the 2010 Commonwealth Games
Commonwealth Games bronze medallists for England
Commonwealth Games medallists in badminton
Jersey badminton players
Badminton players at the 2014 Commonwealth Games
Commonwealth Games competitors for Jersey
Medallists at the 2010 Commonwealth Games